The National Security Council (CSN) of Spain is the principal advisory body used by the Prime Minister for considerations of national security and foreign policy matters with senior ranks of the Administration with competencies in these matters. It was created in 2013 with the unanimous agreement of all political forces in the Cortes Generales within the framework of the National Security Strategy.

CSN meetings are only held when convened by the Prime Minister.

Functions 
According to the National Security Act 36/2015 (LSN), CSN has the following functions:
 To dictate the necessary guidelines in the planning and coordination of the National Security policy.
 To direct and coordinate by Royal Decree the actions of management of crisis situations in the terms foreseen in Title III of the LSN.
 To supervise and coordinate, by Royal Decree, the National Security System.
 Verify the degree of compliance with the National Security Strategy and promote its revisions.
 Promote and encourage the development of the necessary second level strategies and, if necessary, proceed to their approval, as well as their periodic reviews.
 Organize by Royal Decree, the contribution of resources to National Security in accordance with the provisions of the LSN.
 To approve the Annual National Security Report before its presentation in the Cortes Generales.
 Agree the creation and strengthening of the necessary support organs for the performance of their functions.
 To promote the necessary normative proposals for the strengthening of the National Security System.
 Carry out the other functions attributed to it by the applicable legal and regulatory provisions.
 To advise and inform, at least once a year, the King of Spain in his capacity as Supreme Commander of the Armed Forces. The king is chairman of the CSN when he attends its sessions.
In case of crisis:
 The National Security Council shall determine the liaison and coordination mechanisms necessary for the National Security System to be activated in a preventive manner and to monitor the situations likely to arise in a situation of National Security interest.
 In the situation of interest to the National Security, the President of the Government will call the National Security Council to exercise the functions of management and coordination of the management of said Situation, all without prejudice to the application of the legislation in matters of National Defense and of the powers that correspond to the Council of Ministers. In cases where the President of the Government decides to designate a functional authority for the promotion and coordinated management of the actions, the National Security Council will advise on the appointment of such authority.
 The National Security Council shall advise the President of the Government when the situation requires the application of exceptional measures provided for in the crisis management instruments of the international organizations of which Spain is a member, without prejudice to the powers of the Ministers and of the provisions in the legislation on National Defense.

Members

 Felipe VI, The King
 Pedro Sánchez, Prime Minister
 Nadia Calviño, First Deputy Prime Minister and Minister for Economic Affairs
 Yolanda Díaz, Second Deputy Prime Minister and Minister of Labour
 Teresa Ribera, Third Deputy Prime Minister and Minister for the Ecological Transition and Demographic Challenge
 José Manuel Albares, Minister of Foreign Affairs
 Pilar Llop, Minister of Justice
 Margarita Robles, Minister of Defence
 María Jesús Montero, Minister of Finance and Civil Service
 Fernando Grande-Marlaska, Minister of the Interior
 Raquel Sánchez Jiménez, Minister of Transport
 Reyes Maroto, Minister of Industry
 Félix Bolaños, Minister of the Presidency
 Carolina Darias, Minister of Health
 Diana Morant, Minister of Science and Innovation
 Óscar López Águeda, Moncloa Chief of Staff
 Ángeles Moreno Bau, Secretary of State for Foreign Affairs
 Rafael Pérez Ruiz, Secretary of State for Security
 Teodoro Esteban López Calderón, Chief of the Defence Staff
 Esperanza Casteleiro, Director of the National Intelligence Centre
 Miguel Ángel Ballesteros, Director of the Homeland Security Department

Support bodies 

The National Security Act, in its article 21, section 1, letter h, grants the Council the power to create support bodies to carry out its functions. Since 2013, 8 support bodies have been created:

 Specialized Situation Committee or just Situation Committee. Created in 2013 to support the CSN in its functions as crisis manager.
 National Maritime Safety Council, created in 2013.
 National Cybersecurity Council, created in 2013.
 Specialized Immigration Committee, created in 2014.
 Specialized Committee on Energy Security, created in 2017.
 Specialized Non-Proliferation Committee, created in 2017.
 National Aerospace Safety Council, created in 2020.
 Specialized Committee against Terrorism, created in 2020.

Meetings 
Since its inception, the National Security Council has convened 29 times.

References 

Spain
Government agencies established in 2013